Pelzer (German, meaning "furrier") is an occupational surname. Notable people with the surname include:

 Dave Pelzer, author
 Jacques Pelzer (1924–1994), Belgian musician
 Richard B. Pelzer, author
 Teresa Pelzer (1825–1852), noblewoman buried in the Cerasi Chapel

See also
 Pelzer, Indiana, an unincorporated community
 Pelzer, South Carolina, town in Anderson County, South Carolina, United States
 16177 Pelzer, main-belt asteroid

German-language surnames
Occupational surnames